Gordon Anderson may refer to:

 Gordon Anderson (author) (born 1947), author and Secretary-General of the Professors World Peace Academy
 Gordon Anderson (cricketer) (1922–2013), New Zealand cricketer
 Gordon Anderson (politician) (1897–1958), former Member of the Australian House of Representatives
 Gordon Anderson, better known as Lone Pigeon, musician and founding member of The Beta Band
 Gordon Anderson (record producer), see The Rowans
 Gordon Anderson (squash player), squash player from Canada
 Gordon Anderson, a B-movie recurrent hero played by Richard Harrison in his many ninja films
 Gordon Anderson (director), television director
 Gordon Anderson (footballer) (1924–1965), Australian rules footballer
 Gordon Leigh Anderson (born 1944), American sculptor/actor, married to Sondra Locke
 Gordon Stewart Anderson (1958–1991), Canadian writer